Mount Auburn Cemetery, located in Cambridge, Massachusetts, is the first rural or garden cemetery in the United States. It is the burial site of many prominent Boston Brahmins, and is a National Historic Landmark.

Dedicated in 1831 and set with classical monuments in a rolling landscaped terrain, it marked a distinct break with Colonial-era burying grounds and church-affiliated graveyards. The appearance of this type of landscape coincides with the rising popularity of the term "cemetery," derived from the Greek for "a sleeping place," instead of graveyard. This language and outlook eclipsed the previous harsh view of death and the afterlife embodied by old graveyards and church burial plots.

The  cemetery is important both for its historical aspects and for its role as an arboretum. It is Watertown's largest contiguous open space and extends into Cambridge to the east, adjacent to the Cambridge City Cemetery and Sand Banks Cemetery.  It was designated a National Historic Landmark District in 2003 for its pioneering role in 19th-century cemetery development.

History

The land that became Mount Auburn Cemetery was originally named Stone's Farm, though locals referred to it as "Sweet Auburn" after the 1770 poem "The Deserted Village" by Oliver Goldsmith. Mount Auburn Cemetery was inspired by Père Lachaise Cemetery in Paris and was itself an inspiration to cemetery designers, most notably at Green-Wood Cemetery in Brooklyn (1838), Hollywood Cemetery in Richmond, Virginia, and Abney Park in London. Mount Auburn Cemetery was designed largely by Henry Alexander Scammell Dearborn with assistance from Jacob Bigelow and Alexander Wadsworth.

Bigelow came up with the idea for Mount Auburn as early as 1825, though a site was not acquired until five years later. Bigelow, a medical doctor, was concerned about the unhealthiness of burials under churches as well as the possibility of running out of space. The main gate was built in the Egyptian Revival style and cost . The first president of the Mount Auburn Association, Supreme Court Justice Joseph Story, dedicated the cemetery in 1831. Story's dedication address, delivered on September 24, 1831, set the model for many more addresses in the following three decades. Garry Wills focuses on it as an important precursor to President Lincoln's Gettysburg Address.

The cemetery is credited as the beginning of the American public parks and gardens movement. It set the style for other suburban American cemeteries such as Laurel Hill Cemetery (Philadelphia, 1836), Mount Hope Cemetery (Bangor, Maine, 1834), America's first municipal rural cemetery; Green-Wood Cemetery (Brooklyn, 1838), The Green Mount Cemetery (Baltimore, Maryland, 1839)  Mount Hope Cemetery (Rochester, NY, 1838), Lowell Cemetery (Lowell, Massachusetts, 1841), Allegheny Cemetery (Pittsburgh, 1844), Albany Rural Cemetery (Menands, New York, 1844), Swan Point Cemetery (Providence, Rhode Island 1846), Spring Grove Cemetery (Cincinnati, 1844), and Forest Hills Cemetery (Jamaica Plain, 1848) as well as Oakwood Cemetery in Syracuse, New York. It can be considered the link between Capability Brown's English landscape gardens and Frederick Law Olmsted's Central Park in New York (1850s).

Mount Auburn was established at a time when Americans had a sentimental interest in rural cemeteries. It is still well known for its tranquil atmosphere and accepting attitude toward death. Many of the more traditional monuments feature poppy flowers, symbols of blissful sleep. In the late 1830s, its first unofficial guide, Picturesque Pocket Companion and Visitor's Guide Through Mt. Auburn, was published and featured descriptions of some of the more interesting monuments as well as a collection of prose and poetry about death by writers including Nathaniel Hawthorne and Willis Gaylord Clark. Because of the number of visitors, the cemetery's developers carefully regulated the grounds: they had a policy to remove "offensive and improper" monuments and only "proprietors" (i.e., plot owners) could have vehicles on the grounds and were allowed within the gates on Sundays and holidays. However, Mount Auburn differed from previously established cemeteries in that it was open to the general public and was not restricted to specific religious groups, reflecting the growing religious pluralism of Boston during the time.

In the 1840s, Mount Auburn was considered one of the most popular tourist destinations in the nation, along with Niagara Falls and Mount Vernon. A 16-year-old Emily Dickinson wrote about her visit to Mount Auburn in a letter in 1846. 60,000 people visited the cemetery in 1848 alone.

Buildings

The cemetery has three notable buildings on its grounds. Washington Tower was designed by Bigelow and built in 1852–54. Named for George Washington, the  tower was built of Quincy granite and provides excellent views of the area. Bigelow Chapel was built in the 1840s and rebuilt in the 1850s, also of Quincy granite, and was renovated in 1899 under the direction of architect Willard Sears to accommodate a crematorium. Its interior was again renovated in 1924 by Allen and Collins. Through all of these alterations, stained-glass windows by the Scottish firm of Allan & Ballantyne were preserved.

In 1870 the cemetery trustees, feeling the need for additional function space, purchased land across Mount Auburn Street and constructed a reception house. This building was supplanted in the 1890s by the construction of the Story Chapel and Administration Building, adjacent to the main gate. The first reception house was designed by Nathaniel J. Bradlee, and is (like the cemetery) listed on the National Register of Historic Places. The second building was designed by Willard Sears, and is built of Potsdam sandstone in what Sears characterized as "English Perpendicular Style". The chapel in this building was redecorated in 1929 by Allen and Collins to include stained-glass by New England artist Earl E. Sanborn.

Cemetery today

More than 93,000 people are buried in the cemetery as of 2003. A number of historically significant people have been interred there since its inception, particularly members of the Boston Brahmins and the Boston elite associated with Harvard University, as well as a number of prominent Unitarians.

The cemetery is nondenominational and continues to make space available for new plots. The area is well known for its beautiful environs and is a favorite location for bird-watchers; over 220 species of birds have been observed at the cemetery since 1958. Guided tours of the cemetery's historic, artistic, and horticultural points of interest are available.

Mount Auburn's collection of over 5,500 trees includes nearly 700 species and varieties. Thousands of very well-kept shrubs and herbaceous plants weave through the cemetery's hills, ponds, woodlands, and clearings. The cemetery contains more than 10 miles (17 km) of roads and many paths. Landscaping styles range from Victorian-era plantings to contemporary gardens, from natural woodlands to formal ornamental gardens, and from sweeping vistas through majestic trees to small enclosed spaces. Many trees, shrubs, and herbaceous plants are tagged with botanic labels containing their scientific and common names.

The cemetery was among those profiled in the 2005 PBS documentary A Cemetery Special.

Notable burials

Photo gallery

See also
 List of National Historic Landmarks in Massachusetts
 National Register of Historic Places listings in Cambridge, Massachusetts
 Mount Pleasant Cemetery, Toronto, modelled after Mount Auburn

References

Further reading
 Nathaniel Dearborn. A concise history of, and guide through Mount Auburn: with a catalogue of lots laid out in that cemetery; a map of the grounds, and terms of subscription, regulations concerning visitors, interments, &c., &c. Boston: N. Dearborn, 1843. 1857 ed.
 Moses King. [https://books.google.com/books?id=pjYXAAAAYAAJ Mount Auburn cemetery]: including also a brief history and description of Cambridge, Harvard University, and the Union Railway Company. Cambridge, Massachusetts: Moses King, 1883.
 Aaron Sachs (historian). Arcadian America: The Death and Life of an Environmental Tradition. New Haven: Yale University Press, 2013.

External links 

 Mount Auburn Cemetery official site
 
 
 Mount Auburn Cemetery: A New American Landscape, a National Park Service Teaching with Historic Places (TwHP) lesson plan

Buildings and structures in Cambridge, Massachusetts
Botanical gardens in Massachusetts
National Historic Landmarks in Cambridge, Massachusetts
Historic districts in Middlesex County, Massachusetts
Buildings and structures in Watertown, Massachusetts
Cemeteries established in the 1830s
Cemeteries on the National Register of Historic Places in Massachusetts
Cemeteries in Middlesex County, Massachusetts
History of Cambridge, Massachusetts
1831 establishments in Massachusetts
Historic districts on the National Register of Historic Places in Massachusetts
National Register of Historic Places in Cambridge, Massachusetts
Rural cemeteries